Jacques Maus (born 1905, date of death unknown) was a Belgian bobsledder who competed in the early 1930s. He finished tenth in the two-man event at the 1932 Winter Olympics in Lake Placid, New York.

References
1932 bobsleigh two-man results
Photo showing Maus (on left)
Jacques Maus' profile at Sports Reference.com

1905 births
Belgian male bobsledders
Olympic bobsledders of Belgium
Bobsledders at the 1932 Winter Olympics
Year of death missing